Amerobelbidae is a family of mites belonging to the order Sarcoptiformes.

Genera:
 Amerobelba Berlese, 1908
 Berndamerus Mahunka, 1977
 Hellenamerus Mahunka, 1974
 Mongaillardia Grandjean, 1961
 Rastellobata Grandjean, 1961
 Roynortonia Ermilov, 2011

References

Sarcoptiformes